Historically, the wildlife, natural resources, and culture have made Africa a highly valuable continent to the western world. Africa has gathered the attention of western tourists, western explorers, and western imperialists from all over. As such, Africa has been heavily influenced over time by western interests.

History

Colonization of Africa 
Even before the age of exploration, 
countries have been acting based on their own personal interests. It was during the late 1800s that the western world really started to explore deeper into the heart of Africa. What the explorers found was an abundance of land and resources. The only thing standing in their way was a group of primitive people with spears, not guns. Through this technological advantage, Europe was able to successfully claim Africa, its people, and its resources as its own. Seeking only to reap the economic and territorial benefits, settlers created quick local governments instead of industrializing Africa. When countries in Africa began to declare their independence, these newly formed countries were left hundreds of years behind the Western world, with corrupt governments in control.

The White Man's Burden 
First published in 1899 in McClure's magazine, "The White Man's Burden" is a poem of obligation by Rudyard Kipling, rallying the Western world to go to Africa in order to save a supposedly condemned culture. "The White Man's Burden" portrays imperialism as a justified duty. Kipling suggests that Africa's purpose was to act as a stepping-stone for the white man's advancement.

Berlin Conference (1884) 
The Berlin Conference is an example of the Western world's view on imperialism. The conference essentially constituted the division of the African continent among leaders of Western countries.  The participating Western countries represented at the conference included Britain, France, Germany, Denmark, Italy, and others. Their goal was to address the struggle and competition for colonizing Africa. As if the continent was free property, Africa was divided and shared among the Western world.

Statistics

Politics 
From the mid-1900s, Africa slowly gained its independence through a series of coups and uprisings. In 2002, all African countries except Morocco joined together to form the African Union. The mission of this organization is to promote economic and political growth within Africa and provide a form of continental protection. The AU works to combat the historical effects of colonization and apartheid to unify African nations in the mission to address the complex, multifaceted social, economic, and political challenges facing the continent. The AU is very similar to the European Union or NATO. All of these blocks work within the United Nations to push their policies forward. However The AU is a fairly new block compared to the EU and NATO, and therefore is disadvantaged.

Health and wellness 
Western media often portrays Africa as being very impoverished. Global educational inequalities pose major issues for a number of African countries. For example, Hungary's literacy rate of 99% starkly contrasts with Mali's rate of 26%. High rates of malnutrition and disease are a concern for many African nations.

Significance 
This topic is significant to the world today because Africa is part of our world. Rich in natural resources such as diamonds and oil, Africa stands as a major contributor to the world economy. If promoting stability and human rights for economic benefits is not enough, think about this issue from an ethical point of view. Poverty prevents villages from installing wells causing people to travel three miles for dirty lake water that no one in the West would even think about drinking. Corrupt governments are too busy accepting bribes to notice or prevent civil war and massacre within their own borders. Fear drives families to migrate to "safer" areas resulting in cramp and unsanitary refugee camps. Little food, clean water, medical supplies and basic safety are being stripped from people who share this world. Yet these basic rights are the ones that the west seems to take for granted.

Current NGO's 
Non-government Organizations are the world's single forms of international organization, and promote educations, political, human rights and economical equality. The international system is anarchic and without NGO's, there is no hope to create international organization.

UN 
The purpose of the United Nations, one of today's only forms of international order, is to promote international peace. Peace is an idea that almost everyone is in support of. However peace cannot create itself. Without action our world will always be subject to violence and millions of people will be living in constant fear and hunger.

Different perspectives

Africa in media 
The first perspective believes in the complete opposite of this paper. While there are many who believe that Africa is in need, there are many that think Africa does not need help. Unless you have actually traveled to Africa, your only understanding of the culture and area is primarily based on media, and even more specifically, movies. In October, BBC published an article about the growing corruption and devastation in Africa. In response to this article, Edward Mendy stated, "The BBC article, in my opinion, was a typical distortion and sensationalizing of news out of Africa". He continues on claiming, "Africa is developing. The development may be slow but it is sure".

Lawyer Mendy is not the only one who feels this way. Many others believe that Western Media and especially film has exaggerates. "To date only African cinema has dealt with real African dramas".

Charity
Those with this perspective believe that we are neglecting Africa and need to help it. For example, in The Economist, the author wrote, "too often the world has dithered open-mouthed as evil men have slaughtered Daruris or Rwandans".

Priority 
The last perspective is a mix of the latter two. This perspective acknowledges Africa's current condition, but does not help due to personal potential cost or the belief that aiding Africa is not their responsibility. This is the attitude most people carry. To most people the poverty and corruption in Africa is prevalent, yet the thought of personal sacrifice in order to help is often enough to turn us away. The other reason people are turned away is because with organizations such as Oxfam and the United Nations, it feels like there are already institutions created solely for the purpose of aiding others, so the responsibility is upon these institutions. Leaders such as the United States "had vowed never to return to a conflict it couldn't understand, between clans and tribes it didn't know, in a country where the US had no national interests". Unfortunately it is this perspective that challenges perspective number two. Often people want to help but are faced with many costs if they are to help.

See also 
 Poverty in Africa
 African Union

References

Further reading 
 Preventing Rwanda

External links 
 The Water Project
 Why we should care
 World Bank on Africa
 Ethnic Diversity in Africa

African culture